National Route 346 is a national highway of Japan connecting Aoba-ku, Sendai and Kesennuma, Miyagi in Japan, with a total length of 111.6 km (69.35 mi).

References

National highways in Japan
Roads in Iwate Prefecture
Roads in Miyagi Prefecture